Aristide Compagnoni (26 July 1910 – 13 April 1995) was an Italian cross-country skier who competed in the 1930s.

Compagnoni, born in Santa Caterina Valfurva was the brother of the skiers Severino and Ottavio Compagnoni. He won two bronze medals in the 4 x 10 km at the FIS Nordic World Ski Championships (1937 and 1939).

At the 1935 Trofeo Mezzalama, together with Mario Compagnoni and Silvio Confortola, he finished third. The 1938 Trofeo Mezzalama he won together with the brothers
Severino and Silvio Confortola. He participated in the demonstration event, military patrol (precursor to biathlon), in the 1948 Winter Olympics, when he had the military rank Sergente.

Further notable results were:
 1939: 1st, Italian men's championships of cross-country skiing, 18 km
 1940: 3rd, Italian men's championships of cross-country skiing, 18 km
 1941: 1st, Italian men's championships of cross-country skiing, 50 km
 1943: 2nd, Italian men's championships of cross-country skiing, 50 km
 1946: 3rd, Italian men's championships of cross-country skiing, 18 km

References

External links
 
World Championship results 
Interview with Silvio Confortola 

1910 births
1995 deaths
Italian military patrol (sport) runners
Italian male cross-country skiers
Italian male ski mountaineers
Olympic biathletes of Italy
Military patrol competitors at the 1948 Winter Olympics
Sportspeople from the Province of Sondrio
FIS Nordic World Ski Championships medalists in cross-country skiing